Dialepta is a monotypic snout moth genus described by Alfred Jefferis Turner in 1913. Its only species, Dialepta micropolia, described by the same author, is found in Australia.

References

Phycitinae
Monotypic moth genera
Moths of Australia